Blaenau Gwent County Borough Council is the governing body for Blaenau Gwent, one of the Principal Areas of Wales.

History
The borough council was created in 1974 under the Local Government Act 1972 as a lower-tier district council with borough status. Gwent County Council provided county-level services for the area. The county council was abolished in 1996 and Blaenau Gwent became a principal area with county borough status, with the council taking over the functions previously performed by the county council.

Borough status allows Blaenau Gwent to give the chair of the council the title of mayor. However, the council discontinued the role of mayor in 2017, with the last mayor being Barrie Sutton. A presiding member role has been created instead to chair meetings.

Political control
The first election to the council was held in 1973, initially operating as a shadow authority before coming into its powers on 1 April 1974. Political control of the council since 1974 has been held by the following parties:

Lower-tier borough

County borough

Leadership
The leaders of the council since 2001 have been:

Current composition
As of 11 May 2022:

Party with majority control in bold.

Elections
Summary of the council composition after council elections, click on the year for full details of each election.

Party with the most elected councillors in bold. Coalition agreements in notes column

Prior to May 2017 the Labour Party had firm control of Blaenau Gwent council, with 30 seats. However, at the May 2017 council elections the numbers of Labour councillors was greatly reduced, with the Independents winning majority control. The Conservatives and Greens failed to win any seats.

Labour regained a majority control of the council at the 2022 local elections. The former Independent leader of the council, Nigel Daniels, lost his seat.

On 11 May 2022 Carl Bainton joined the Labour Group after being elected as an Independent councillor.

Premises
Until 2021 the council was based at Ebbw Vale Civic Centre, which had been built in the 1960s for the former Ebbw Vale Urban District Council. In 2021 the council voted to demolish the civic centre and moved its meeting place and headquarters to the General Office building adjoining Ebbw Vale Town railway station. The General Office building had been built in 1916 as the offices for the Ebbw Vale Iron and Steel Company. The refurbished and extended building also serves as a conference centre and houses Gwent Archives.

Electoral wards

Following a review by the Local Democracy and Boundary Commission for Wales the number of electoral wards reduced from 16 to 14 at the 2022 local elections. The number of councillors dropped from 42 to 33. The following table lists the pre-2022 council wards, as well as communities and associated geographical areas. Communities with a community council are indicated with an asterisk (*).

Criticism of councillors' conduct 
Joanne Collins, the council's executive member for education and also a governor of her son's primary school took her family on holiday during school term time, "in direct contravention of her department's own policy", reported Private Eye in April 2020.  The council reportedly distributes a pamphlet titled "School Attendance - a guide for parents of children starting school" that clearly states Blaenau Gwent Council "requested headteachers do not authorise any holidays in term time".  The booklet had been published by Families First, a Welsh Government project, in conjunction with the council.  Collins' action reportedly caused resentment among local families who had been refused permission to take a holiday during term time to save on cost.  In response, council leader, Nigel Daniels, issued a statement to the South Wales Argus newspaper stating the "holiday in question was authorised ... and fully complied with the policy".

Arms

References

External links
Blaenau Gwent County Borough Council

Politics of Blaenau Gwent
Blaenau Gwent